John Button may refer to:

Politicians
John Button (Australian politician)
John Bolton (Haverfordwest MP) (by 1524–56 or later), or John Button, English politician, MP for Haverfordwest 
John Button (1624–1679), English politician who sat in the House of Commons at various times between 1659 and 1679 for Lymington
John Button (Parliamentarian) (died 1665), English politician who sat in the House of Commons at various times between 1625 and 1648 for Lymington

Others
John Button (artist) (1929–1982), American artist
John Button (campaigner) (born 1944), Western Australian victim of a miscarriage of justice
John Button (racing driver) (1943–2014), British rallycross driver and father of Jenson Button
John Button (soldier) (1772–1861), Canadian soldier (Captain) and founder of the 1st York Light Dragoons
John Button, of the Button baronets

See also
Button (name)